Pudukkottai may refer to:
Pudukkottai town in Tamil Nadu
Pudukkottai District
Pudukkottai (Lok Sabha constituency)
Pudukkottai state